The 1989 Giro d'Italia was the 72nd edition of the race. It started off in Taormina on 21 May with a  flat stage that ended in Catania. The race concluded in Florence with a  individual time trial on 11 June. Twenty-two teams entered the race, which was won by the Frenchman Laurent Fignon of the Super U team. Second and third respectively were the Italian Flavio Giupponi and the American rider, Andrew Hampsten.

In the race's other classifications, Vladimir Poulnikov of the Alfa Lum-STM finished the Giro as the best neo-professional in the general classification, finishing in eleventh place overall; Café de Colombia rider Luis Herrera won the mountains classification, Giovanni Fidanza of the Chateau d'Ax-Salotti team won the points classification, and  rider Jure Pavlič won the inaugural intergiro classification. Fagor - MBK finished as the winners of the Trofeo Fast Team classification, ranking each of the twenty-two teams contesting the race by lowest cumulative time.

Teams

There were 22 teams that were invited to compete in the 1989 Giro d'Italia. Each team consisted of nine riders, so the Giro started with 198 riders. Of the 198 riders that started the race, 141 of them reached the finish line in Florence. The peloton featured for the first time Soviet riders as a ban on cyclists becoming professional. These Soviet cyclists competed for Alfa Lum, a team of nine Soviets.

The teams entering the race were:

Pre-race favorites

Many expected the winner of the race to be a foreign, non-Italian rider. Several riders were seen as contenders for the overall crown. La Liberté named the following contenders: Hampsten, Greg LeMond, Luis Herrera, Erik Breukink, Laurent Fignon, Phil Anderson, Urs Zimmermann, and Claude Criquielion. De Telegraaf listed the three favorites to be Breukink, Hampsten, and Roche. Former winner Stephen Roche returned to the Giro following a year absence and recently visited a doctor in Munich to treat one of his knees. Roche was anticipated to receive a poor welcome due to how he won the Giro in 1987 by taking the lead from Italian and teammate Roberto Visentini. Reigning champion Hampsten entered the Giro after showing good forming in the early calendar races. Hampsten himself stated he felt good entering the race and stated the route did not offer many opportunities to recover. In addition, Hampsten had been specifically training for the individual time trial in his home in Boulder, Colorado in the weeks preceding the race's start. When asked about the inclusion of the Passo di Gavia – which was crossed the previous year in blizzard conditions on a day where Hampsten secured the race lead – Hampsten hoped to "... cross that mountain when the sun shines." Breukink was seen as the best hope for a Dutch rider to win the Giro due to third and second-place finishes in 1987 and 1988, respectively. Fignon and Zimmmermann were seen as strong contenders to compete for the victory following their joint attack on the Col de la Croix in the Tour de Romandie. Fignon, a two-time winner of the Tour de France, entered the Giro for the first time since his controversial loss to Francesco Moser in 1984. In the years after his first Tour victory in 1984, Fignon's seasons were plagued by poor performances due to a variety of injuries. He had returned to form starting in 1988 with a win in Milan–San Remo, which he repeated as champion in 1989. Fignon's teammates were regarded as a weak point for his title hopes as they were felt to be weaker than his previous teams in the early 1980s.

Urs Freuler was seen as a rider to contend for his fourteenth Giro stage win, while Dutch sprinter Jean-Paul van Poppel was seen as a prominent challenger for Freuler in the sprint stages. Zimmermann was seen as a candidate to win if he could limit his losses in the time trials. Herrera, Criquielion, and Maurizio Fondriest all rode their first Giro. Limburgsch dagblad felt the race attracted most top tier riders to participate except for Pedro Delgado, Charly Mottet, and Steven Rooks, among others. Luis Gómez of El País felt the main novelty of the race was the presence of the Alfa Lum team rostered with Soviet riders, including the likes of 23-year old Dimitri Konyshev whom they hoped would finish high overall. He also felt LeMond's form was poor. Herrera came to the Giro hoping for success as the stages were shorter than the Tour's and the general pace of the Giro is slower than the Tour. Lejaretta hoped to challenge for stage wins in the mountains due to the toughness climbs. Fondriest was seen as the main Italian hope as he was an all-rounder who was only 24-years of age.

Route and stages

The route for the 1989 edition of the Giro d'Italia was revealed to the public on television by head organizer Vincenzo Torriani, on 21 January 1989. It contained four time trial events, three of which were individual and one a team event. There were fourteen stages containing thirty-five categorized climbs, of which three had summit finishes: stage 2, to Mount Etna; stage 8, to Gran Sasso d'Italia; and stage 13, to Tre Cime di Lavaredo. Another stage with a mountain-top finish was stage 18, which consisted of a climbing time trial to Monte Generoso. The organizers chose to not include any rest days. When compared to the previous year's race, the race was  shorter, contained the number of rest days and time trials, and had one more stage. In addition, this race contained one less set of half stages. After the route had been announced in January, former winner Francesco Moser – who joined the race organizing staff – received criticism as the route was thought to be very difficult and "heavy." This criticism was due to Moser's history of complaining routes were too difficult in the past, when many viewed them not as such.

The sixteenth day of racing was thought to be the queen stage of the race as it featured several categorized climbs, including the Cima Coppi, the Passo di Gavia. Due to harsh weather the day of the sixteenth stage and beforehand, much snow had been deposited along the roads that were to be used. Organizers made the choice to cancel the stage because of the conditions that also included sub-freezing temperatures. Riders primarily agreed with the decision as it was best for rider safety, but Hampsten believed that the stage could have provided some chances to attack then race leader Fignon. A L'Impartial writer described how race organizer Torriani had been creating race routes that favored sprinters and average climbers like Francesco Moser and Giuseppe Saronni in the early 1980s and late 1970s, but had made the race more exciting as of late.

Classification leadership

Four different jerseys were worn during the 1989 Giro d'Italia. The leader of the general classification – calculated by adding the stage finish times of each rider, and allowing time bonuses for the first three finishers on mass-start stages – wore a pink jersey. This classification is the most important of the race, and its winner is considered as the winner of the Giro. There were no time bonuses awarded for stage placings.

For the points classification, which awarded a purple (or cyclamen) jersey to its leader, cyclists were given points for finishing a stage in the top 15; additional points could also be won in intermediate sprints. The green jersey was awarded to the mountains classification leader. In this ranking, points were won by reaching the summit of a climb ahead of other cyclists. Each climb was ranked as either first, second or third category, with more points available for higher category climbs. The Cima Coppi, the race's highest point of elevation, awarded more points than the other first category climbs. The Cima Coppi for this Giro was the Passo di Gavia, but due to inclement weather, the stage containing the Gavia was cancelled. The white jersey was worn by the leader of young rider classification, a ranking decided the same way as the general classification, but considering only neo-professional cyclists (in their first three years of professional racing).

The intergiro classification was introduced as a means of making the race more interesting and its leader was denoted by a blue jersey. The calculation for the intergiro is similar to that of the general classification, in each stage there is a midway point that the riders pass through a point and where their time is stopped. As the race goes on, their times compiled and the person with the lowest time is the leader of the intergiro classification and wears the blue jersey. The first three to cross the sprint line would receive five, three, and two second time bonuses towards the general classification. Although no jersey was awarded, there was also one classification for the teams, in which the stage finish times of the best three cyclists per team were added; the leading team was the one with the lowest total time.

The rows in the following table correspond to the jerseys awarded after that stage was run.

Final standings

General classification

Points classification

Mountains classification

Young rider classification

Intergiro classification

Combativity classification

Intermediate sprints classification

Final kilometer classification

Team classification

References

Citations

 
1989
Giro d'Italia, 1989
Giro d'Italia, 1989
Giro d'Italia
Giro d'Italia